George Chadwick, better known by his stage name Telephone Jim Jesus, is an alternative hip hop producer based in Oakland, California. He is a member of Restiform Bodies along with Passage and Bomarr.

History
Telephone Jim Jesus released his debut solo album, A Point Too Far to Astronaut, on Anticon in 2004.

His second solo album, Anywhere Out of the Everything, was released on Anticon in 2007. He toured the United States with Sole and the Skyrider Band in the next year.

He formed the group Furious Stylz with drummer John Wagner and producer Skyrider.

Discography

Solo
 A Point Too Far to Astronaut (2004)
 Anywhere Out of the Everything (2007)

Telephone Jim Jesus & The Bomarr Monk
 Live at the Chapel of the Chimes (2006)

Restiform Bodies
 Restiform Bodies (2001)
 TV Loves You Back (2008)

Productions
 Sole - "Da Baddest Poet" "Ode to the War on Terrorism" from Selling Live Water (2003)
 Sole - "Locust Farm" from Live from Rome (2005)

Contributions
 Passage - "Old Aunt Mary" "Suffragette" "Pail of Air" from The Forcefield Kids (2004)
 Pedestrian - "The History Channel..." from Volume One: UnIndian Songs (2005)
 Alias & Tarsier - "Dr. C" from Brookland/Oaklyn (2006)

References

Anticon
American hip hop record producers
Musicians from the San Francisco Bay Area
People from New London, New Hampshire